Andrew Cameron may refer to:
Andrew Cameron (labor leader) (1834–1890), founder of the National Labor Union, US
Andrew Cameron (Presbyterian minister) (1855–1925), New Zealand Presbyterian minister, educationalist and community leader
Andy Cameron (comedian) (born 1940), comedian
Bruce Cameron (bishop) (Andrew Bruce Cameron, born 1941), Scottish Anglican bishop
Andrew Cameron (police officer), Chief Constable of Central Scotland Police
Andrew Collier Cameron, British astronomer
Andrew Schulz (Andrew Cameron Schulz), American stand-up comedian

See also 
Andy Cameron (disambiguation)